The 2016 season was Persib Bandung's 83rd in existence season in the top flight of Indonesian football. Along with Indonesia Soccer Championship, the club also competed in the Bali Island Cup and Bhayangkara Cup. Following the renovated of Si Jalak Harupat for the upcoming 2016 Indonesian National Games (PON XIX), Persib use Gelora Bandung Lautan Api starting from week 7 until 27 as their regular ground. After the 2016 Indonesian National Games have ended, Persib use Si Jalak Harupat again starting from week 28 onwards as their regular ground.

Players

Squad information

Player Loaned

Febri Hariyadi and Gian Zola loaned to West Java PON for Indonesia National Sport Weeks until the end of the event.

Pre-season and friendlies

Competitions

Overall

Last updated: 5 August 2016

Indonesia Soccer Championship

League table

Results summary

Results by round

Matches

Score overview

Note: Persib Bandung goals are listed first.

2016 Bali Island Cup

Final standings

2016 Bhayangkara Cup

Group stage-Group A

Semi-final

Final

Statistics

Appearances and goals

|-
! colspan="14" style="background:#dcdcdc; text-align:center"| Goalkeepers

|-
! colspan="14" style="background:#dcdcdc; text-align:center"| Defenders

|-
! colspan="14" style="background:#dcdcdc; text-align:center"| Midfielders

|-
! colspan="14" style="background:#dcdcdc; text-align:center"| Forwards

|-

Goalscorers

Assists

Clean sheets

Disciplinary record

Suspensions

References

Persib Bandung
Persib Bandung seasons